Brachyloma daphnoides, commonly known as daphne heath, is a flowering plant in the family Ericaceae. It is a small upright shrub with dull grey-green leaves and white tubular flowers.

Description

Taxonomy and naming
Brachyloma daphnoides  was first formally described 1868  by James Edward Smith and the description was published in Flora Australiensis. The specific epithet (daphnoides)  means like "daphne".

Distribution and habitat
Daphne heath grows mostly on rocky sites in woodland and forests in South Australia, Victoria, New South Wales and Queensland.

References

Epacridoideae
Flora of New South Wales
Flora of Queensland
Flora of South Australia
Victoria
Taxa named by George Bentham
Taxa named by James Edward Smith